Halvai-ye Do (also Romanized as Ḩalvā’ī-ye Do; also known as Alvāhī and Ḩalvā’ī) is a village in Karian Rural District, in the Central District of Minab County, Hormozgan Province, Iran. At the 2006 census, its population was 136, in 28 families.

References 

Populated places in Minab County